Rejoicing in the Hands (full title Rejoicing in the Hands of the Golden Empress) is the third studio album from psychedelic folk musician Devendra Banhart and the second full release for the label Young God. It was recorded during 2003 and was released on April 24, 2004.

The song "Insect Eyes" was featured in the teaser trailer for the 2007 horror film The Hills Have Eyes 2.
The song "The Body Breaks" was used in the 2007 film Eagle vs. Shark. The song "A Sight to Behold" was also used in a season 2 episode of "Sons of Anarchy".

As of September 2005 Rejoicing in the Hands has sold 24,000 copies in United States, also first four albums collectively have sold 56,000 units up to 2005.

Reception

At Metacritic, which assigns a normalised rating out of 100 to reviews from mainstream critics, Rejoicing in the Hands received an average score of 88, based on 21 reviews, indicating "universal acclaim". The music review online magazine Pitchfork placed Rejoicing in the Hands at number 193 on their list of top 200 albums of the 2000s.

The album was also included in the book 1001 Albums You Must Hear Before You Die.

Track listing

Personnel
Devendra Banhart – bass, guitar (acoustic, electric), piano, vocals, producer, drawing
Vashti Bunyan – vocals
Paul Cantelon – violin
Thor Harris – percussion, vibraphone
Julia Kent – cello
Joe McGinty – organ, piano
Steve Moses – percussion, drums
Michael Gira – producer
Jason LaFarge – engineer
Doug Henderson – mastering, mixing
Georgia Bridges – engineer
Lynn Bridges – engineer

Chart performance

References

Devendra Banhart albums
2004 albums
Young God Records albums
Albums produced by Michael Gira